Craig Morgan Teicher (born 1979) is an American author, poet and literary critic. His poetry collection, The Trembling Answers, won the Lenore Marshall Poetry Prize in 2018. He currently lives in New Jersey.

Biography
Teicher was born in New York in 1979. He studied at Columbia University where he received an MFA in 2005.

His  poetry collection, The Trembling Answers, won the Lenore Marshall Poetry Prize in 2018.  He is the author of two other poetry collections, Brenda is in the Other Room and Other Poems, published in 2008, winner of the Colorado Poetry Prize and To Keep Love Blurry, published in 2012. In 2010, Teicher published  the prose collection, Cradle Book: Stories and Fables, and in 2014, the chapbook, Ambivalence and Other Conundrums. His debut collection of essays, We Begin in Gladness, was published by Graywolf Press in 2018. 
 
Teicher is the director of digital operations at The Paris Review and is a poetry editor of The Literary Review. Teicher lives in Verona, New Jersey, with his wife, the poet Brenda Shaughnessy, and their children.

Bibliography

Poetry
Collections and chapbooks
 Brenda is in the Other Room and Other Poems, (Center for Literary Publishing, 2008)
 To Keep Love Blurry (BOA Editions, 2012)
 Ambivalence and Other Conundrums, (Omnidawn, 2014), chapbook
 The Trembling Answers (BOA Editions, 2017)

List of poems

Prose
 Cradle Book (BOA Editions, 2010)
 We Begin in Gladness, (Graywolf Press, 2018)

Awards
 Colorado Poetry Prize, 2007
 The Lenore Marshall Poetry Prize, 2018

References

1979 births
Living people
American poets
American writers
Columbia University School of the Arts alumni
The New Yorker people
People from Verona, New Jersey